Edward Glyn James (born 17 December 1941) is a Welsh former professional footballer. He played as a defender. He spent his entire professional career with Blackpool.

James also represented Wales on nine occasions.

Early life
James became a Welshman in unusual circumstances: his parents were both English and lived a few miles from the Welsh border but James was delivered in the nearest nursing home across the border in Llangollen. He was brought up in Weston Rhyn near Oswestry in Shropshire.

He was educated at Oswestry Boys High School, where one of his contemporaries was Alan Ball, Jr who later played alongside James when Ball played for Blackpool during 1961 to 1966. He played for the school team as well as turning out for Gobowen Juniors and the Druids club at Ruabon.

Club career
He was recommended to Blackpool by the former Wales international Billy Matthews, who was a Blackpool scout. He joined the Seasiders as a trainee in December 1957 and signed as a professional in May 1959.

Blackpool manager Ron Suart gave James his Blackpool debut on 28 September 1960, in a goalless draw at Leeds United in the League Cup. He made four more appearances in 1960–61 — three in the League and one in the League Cup.

Over the next three seasons, James made only seventeen league appearances. In 1964–65, however, Ron Suart gave him an extended run in the team. He made 35 league appearances, and appeared in Blackpool's one FA Cup match and two League Cup encounters.

In 1965–66, James scored his first goal – against Manchester City in the FA Cup third round on 22 January 1966. He also scored in the league, in a 4–1 defeat by Liverpool at Anfield on 19 February.

James made 34 league appearances during Blackpool's 1966–67 campaign, at the end of which they were relegated to Division Two.

The following season, 1967–68, under new manager Stan Mortensen, James made another 34 league appearances. He scored two goals – firstly in a 1–1 league draw with Rotherham United at Bloomfield Road on 24 February 1968, and again two weeks later in a 2–2 draw at Plymouth Argyle.

He was an ever-present during the 1968–69 league campaign, scoring four goals in his 42 appearances. The goals came in a 1–1 home draw with Preston North End on 16 September 1968; a 3–0 victory over Crystal Palace, also at home, on 26 October; in a 1–1 draw at home to Middlesbrough on 7 December; and in a 1–1 draw at home to Aston Villa.

In 1969–70 (under another new manager, Les Shannon), James scored two league goals (both in victories), helping Blackpool to a runners-up finishing place and promotion back to Division One. He was named the club's Player of the Year for his efforts. The subsequent 1970–71 season was a disaster for Blackpool, however, and they were relegated whence they had come twelve months earlier.

Bob Stokoe, who succeeded Les Shannon during the previous term, moved James to the forward line for the first third of the 1971–72 season. James scored six goals in those fifteen games (including four in the first two games), but a combination of the team's losing by single goals here and there and the arrival of Keith Dyson, he was moved back into defence, and Blackpool went on to finish sixth. James scored a goal in Blackpool's 5–0 whitewash of Charlton Athletic at Bloomfield Road on the final day of the season – a result that relegated the Londoners.

James completed his second ever-present season in 1973–74, under new manager Harry Potts.

In James' final season, 1974–75, he made twelve league appearances, helping Blackpool to a top-ten finish for the fourth consecutive season. His final appearance occurred on 18 January 1975, in a single-goal victory over Fulham at Bloomfield Road.

Later career
Following his retirement from football, James set up a laundry and dry cleaning business and included his former club amongst his clientele.

Blackpool F.C. Hall of Fame
James was inducted into the Hall of Fame at Bloomfield Road, when it was officially opened by former Blackpool player Jimmy Armfield in April 2006. Organised by the Blackpool Supporters Association, Blackpool fans around the world voted on their all-time heroes. Five players from each decade are inducted; James is in the 1960s.

International career
James won nine caps for Wales between 1965 and 1971.

Career statistics

Club statistics

International statistics

See also
One-club man.

References

Further reading

External links
 
 

1941 births
People from Llangollen
Sportspeople from Denbighshire
Living people
Welsh footballers
Wales international footballers
Wales under-23 international footballers
Druids F.C. players
Blackpool F.C. players
English Football League players
Association football central defenders